Bode may refer to:

People 
 Bode (surname)
 Bode Miller (born 1977), American skier
 Bode Sowande (born 1948), Nigerian writer and dramatist 
 Bode Thomas (1918–1953), Nigerian politician

Geography 
 Böde, village in Zala County, Hungary
 Bode, Iowa, city in Humboldt County, Iowa, United States
 Bode, Nepal, city in Bhaktapur District, Nepal
 Bode (river), a major river in Saxony-Anhalt, Germany, tributary of the Saale
 Bode (Wipper), a small river in Thuringia, Germany, tributary of the Wipper

Other 
 Bode (crater), lunar crater
 Bode plot, graph used in electrical engineering and control theory
 Bode (fashion brand), American clothing company

See also
 Bodie (disambiguation)
 Bodhi